Stanislav Mikhailovich Chistov (born April 17, 1983) is a Russian professional ice hockey player currently playing for HC Lada Togliatti of the Supreme Hockey League.

Playing career
Prior to playing professionally, Chistov played for the Georgetown Raiders Junior A hockey club in Georgetown, Ontario.

Chistov began his career in the Avangard Omsk organization, playing for their Russian Superleague team in Omsk from 1999–2002. In the 2001 NHL Entry Draft, Chistov was drafted fifth overall by the Mighty Ducks of Anaheim. While military obligations complicated Chistov's transfer to North America, he and fellow draftee Alexander Frolov left Russia anyway, in 2002, ultimately signing with the Ducks after a prolonged dispute with Russian officials.

In his rookie season in the NHL (2002–03), Chistov managed 30 points in 79 regular season games. The next year, Chistov struggled, and he was sent down to Anaheim's American Hockey League (AHL) affiliate, the Cincinnati Mighty Ducks. He remained there during the 2004–05 NHL lockout, until he decided he did not want to play in the minor pros, and he and the club parted ways.

Chistov returned to Russia for the 2005–06 season, where he enjoyed a solid campaign playing on Evgeni Malkin's line for the Super League's Metallurg Magnitogorsk. In the summer of 2006, Chistov signed a two-year, one-way contract with the Anaheim Ducks. On November 13, 2006, Chistov was traded to the Boston Bruins for a third round draft pick in the 2008 NHL entry draft. In the summer of 2007, Chistov signed with Salavat Yulaev Ufa of the Russian Super League. By February 2008, Chistov had parted ways with Salavat Yulaev Ufa, and while he was reportedly skating with the Boston Bruins' minor league affiliate, the Providence Bruins, he did not return to the Bruins.

On August 23, 2008, he moved from Avangard Omsk to Metallurg Magnitogorsk.

Career statistics

Regular season and playoffs

International

References

External links
 

1983 births
Living people
Anaheim Ducks draft picks
Anaheim Ducks players
Avangard Omsk players
Avtomobilist Yekaterinburg players
Boston Bruins players
Cincinnati Mighty Ducks players
Dinamo Riga players
HC Lada Togliatti players
Lokomotiv Yaroslavl players
Metallurg Novokuznetsk players
Metallurg Magnitogorsk players
Mighty Ducks of Anaheim players
National Hockey League first-round draft picks
Portland Pirates players
Russian expatriates in the United States
Russian ice hockey left wingers
Salavat Yulaev Ufa players
HC Spartak Moscow players
Sportspeople from Chelyabinsk
Traktor Chelyabinsk players